Stratovarius is a Finnish power metal band that formed in 1985. Since their formation, they have released sixteen studio albums, five DVDs and six live albums. In its history, the band has gone through many chaotic lineup changes, and after founding guitarist Timo Tolkki's departure in 2008, there are no founding members of the band that remain. Currently, the longest standing member is singer Timo Kotipelto, who joined in 1994.

The first incarnation of the band had the name Black Water, founded in August 1984 by singer and drummer Tuomo Lassila, guitarist Staffan Stråhlman, and bassist John Vihervä. After reforming as Stratovarius, line-up changes started to occur, including Timo Tolkki replacing Black Water member Stråhlman and taking over singing duties as well, and the band expanding to a quartet with the arrival of keyboardist Antti Ikonen the following year. Under this line-up, the band released its first album Fright Night in 1989, with Tolkki as the only songwriter. While the band went through many bassists, the band released the albums Twilight Time in 1992 and Dreamspace in 1994. In 1994, Tolkki decided to stop acting as lead vocalist, with Kotipelto joining the band. After the release of Fourth Dimension in 1995, Ikonen and the last Black Water member, Lassila, left the band and were replaced by Jens Johansson and Jörg Michael respectively.

This line-up consisting of Kotipelto, Tolkki, bassist Jari Kainulainen, Johansson and Michael, now recognized as the "classic line-up" of Stratovarius, became the longest line-up in its history (1995-2005). With this line-up, the band released eight albums including most of their popular works (releasing an album with the same line-up as its predecessor for the first time) until the release of a self-titled album in 2005, after which Kainulainen departed and was replaced by Lauri Porra. In 2008 guitarist, sole founder, composer and main lyricist Timo Tolkki, being highly critical of their last album and tired of the tensions between the members, decided to disband Stratovarius. However, at the demand of the rest of the band, he agreed to let them continue as Stratovarius while leaving the band. He subsequently regretted his decision, stating that the current band had nothing to do with Stratovarius which he considered as mainly his own work.

Despite the controversy of Tolkki's departure, the band's following albums Polaris (2009) and Elysium (2011) received positive reception, with various critics and fans considering them their best albums in the last decade. These were the first albums with Porra and new guitarist Matias Kupiainen, and all members except Michael were part of the songwriting process. After a small "Farewell Jörg" tour in Finland, Jörg Michael departed for personal reasons in 2012. With new drummer Rolf Pilve, the band released Nemesis in 2013 and Eternal in 2015. Stratovarius' sixteenth studio album, and its first in seven years, Survive, was released on September 23, 2022.

History

Background (as Black Water), formation and Fright Night (1984–1990)
Black Water was founded in August 1984 in Finland. They went through a number of personnel and style before the band found its own voice. The founding members were Tuomo Lassila, Staffan Stråhlman, and John Vihervä. By 1985, the name had disbanded and reformed as Stratovarius (a portmanteau of Stratocaster and Stradivarius, which is also the name of an early Kraftwerk song), with guitarist/vocalist Timo Tolkki entering the band in December of that year, replacing Black Water member Stråhlman. In 1988 they released their first two singles, "Future Shock" and "Black Night". In 1989 their debut album Fright Night was released, which would be accompanied by a small tour of Europe.

Twilight Time, Dreamspace and Fourth Dimension (1991–1995)
In 1991 the group released their second album, which was initially released under the name Stratovarius II but was later re-released in 1992 with the name Twilight Time. On this album, Tolkki played bass as well as guitar on all tracks, despite Jari Behm receiving credit on the album. After Twilight Time was released, Behm was fired and replaced with Jari Kainulainen. In 1994 Dreamspace, their third album, was released. This album was the last album that followed the style of the initial releases because when Tolkki abandoned his position as lead singer the group adopted the more neo-classical/symphonic style which they became famous for.

After releasing the album Dreamspace, Timo Tolkki decided to step down from the lead singer position of the band to concentrate on guitar and songwriting as well as to move Stratovarius in a new direction. The band started auditions for a new singer, eventually choosing Timo Kotipelto. In 1995, the band released their first album with Kotipelto on vocals Fourth Dimension, which was accompanied by a music video for the song "Against the Wind". This was the last album with a singing performance by Timo Tolkki, being featured as a backing vocalist on this album. This was the first album that showed signs of the new direction the band was heading, with tracks such as "Twilight Symphony" using an orchestra for the first time in their recordings.

Departures of Tuomo Lassila and Antti Ikonen, Episode, Visions and Destiny (1996–1999)
It was in this period that the last member of Black Water left Stratovarius. Unhappy with the new direction the band was heading, Tuomo Lassila decided to leave the band along with Antti Ikonen, leaving Stratovarius searching for a new drummer and keyboardist to fill their places. Jörg Michael from Rage was hired as their drummer and soon after, Jens Johansson of Yngwie Malmsteen-fame was hired as keyboardist, a position he has held to this date. This new line-up released Episode, an album that showcased their new symphonic direction with a full orchestra and choir utilized on tracks such as "Season of Change" and "Forever". The line-up on this album proved to be their most stable, remaining the same until the release of Polaris in 2009.

In 1997 the band released their sixth studio album titled Visions. This album was released to a very positive reception and featured notable songs "The Kiss of Judas", "Black Diamond" and the title track "Visions (Southern Cross)", a 10-minute epic that was their longest song at the time. "Black Diamond" has since become one of their most recognized songs, and has been included in almost all live setlists since its release. In the same year, the band recorded the album Destiny, which reached No. 1 on the Finnish charts. Destiny contained "S.O.S." and "Rebel", as well as the 10-minute title track "Destiny".

Infinite, Intermission and Elements, Pts. 1 & 2 (2000–2003)
In 2000, the album Infinite was released. Just like its predecessor, Infinite reached No.1 in the Finnish chart, the last time one of their albums would do so until the release of Elysium in 2011. Continuing the trend of featuring lengthy symphonic pieces, the titular track "Infinity" is over 9 minutes long. Featured songs are "Hunting High and Low" and "A Million Light Years Away".
The following year saw the release of Intermission a compilation album of B-Sides, bonus tracks from previous albums and unreleased material. During this time, the band decided to take a break from working on new material for Stratovarius. It was in this time that Timo Tolkki released his second solo album Hymn to Life and guest appeared on the Avantasia album The Metal Opera (Tolkki would later play guest guitar on the sequel album The Metal Opera Part II). Timo Kotipelto also began his side project Kotipelto, with the first album Waiting for the Dawn getting released in 2002.

In 2002 the band started work on their next project titled Elements. Initially conceived as a double album, the project was eventually split into two different releases, with Elements Pt. 1 and Elements Pt. 2 both being released the same year in 2003. This would contain some of the group's most ambitious work yet, with the title track "Elements" on Elements Pt. 1 clocking in at 12 minutes, the longest song the band would write until the release of Elysium in 2011. Elements was also the first, and so far only attempt at recording a double-album, and showed the band experimenting with their musical style.

Hiatus, Stratovarius and Tolkki's departure (2004–2008)
During this period, tensions were increasing in the band, and in 2004 Stratovarius temporarily disbanded after Timo Tolkki suffered a nervous breakdown. A couple of months after the breakdown, Tolkki was diagnosed with bipolar disorder and went into rehabilitation for a period. During this time, Timo Kotipelto released his second album with his side project Kotipelto titled Coldness. It was also during this time that Stratovarius orchestrated a series of publicity stunts, including Kotipelto being fired and replaced by a female singer named "Miss K" (Katriina Wiiala), as well as Tolkki being stabbed at a concert. Eventually, the stunts were revealed to be a hoax, and Tolkki reunited the band to begin work on their next album. In 2005, the self-titled album Stratovarius was released to hostile reception by fans. Stratovarius featured a very different change in style compared to previous efforts, containing almost no symphonic or neo-classical elements in the music or soloing of Tolkki and Johansson that fans were used to, and did not feature any lengthy epics. Tolkki was highly critical of the album, and Stratovarius showed evidence of the band relationship at an all-time low. Seemingly against Tolkki's wishes, Jari Kainulainen was fired in 2005 following the release of the album for reasons Tolkki said were "so absurd that I am not even [going to] try and explain them here". Kainulainen was quickly replaced with Lauri Porra, and in 2006 the band began work on a new album that was tentatively titled R...R..., however, as internal issues increased, the project stalled. Eventually, the band reached a divide, with Johansson and Porra supporting Tolkki on one side, and Kotipelto and Michael on the other. Finally, on 4 March 2008, Tolkki officially declared that he was disbanding Stratovarius:

"It is time to stop the silence and announce what some of you have already been speculating. Stratovarius is no more..."
As Tolkki held the rights to the name Stratovarius and all its royalties, it was his initial intention to completely disband Stratovarius. However, on 20 May 2008 he agreed to sign over the rights to the name Stratovarius and all its royalties to Timo Kotipelto, Jens Johansson and Jörg Michael (though Michael was initially against using the name Stratovarius), allowing Stratovarius to continue on without him. Tolkki later took the songs he wrote for the R..R.. sessions and formed the band Revolution Renaissance, using the R...R... to form the name of the band, instead of the album. Stratovarius eventually found a replacement guitarist with Matias Kupiainen, and soon after began work on their next album.

First years without Tolkki: Polaris and Elysium (2009–2012)
 
In 2009 came the release of Polaris, which reached No. 2 in Finland. It was the first album after the departure of Timo Tolkki and Jari Kainulainen, and featured in their place new guitarist Matias Kupiainen and bassist Lauri Porra. The album yielded the two singles "Deep Unknown" and "Higher We Go". In 2010 the album was re-released along with different live material recorded during the Polaris Tour.

In September 2010, Stratovarius announced the start of recording of their second album with Matias Kupiainen on guitar. Before officially launching the album, the Darkest Hours EP was released with the new songs "Darkest Hours" and "Infernal Maze", plus two live recordings of older songs. To promote the new album, Stratovarius toured as guests on Helloween's Seven Sinners Tour. As Stratovarius's drummer Jörg Michael was diagnosed with cancer, he was temporarily replaced by Alex Landenburg in the band.

In 2011, the band released their new album titled Elysium that quickly reached No. 1 in Finland, the first of their albums to reach No.1 since Infinite. Notable songs on the album include the singles "Darkest Hours", "Under Flaming Skies", and the 18-minute epic "Elysium", the longest song that Stratovarius has ever recorded.

Jörg Michael has announced his plans to leave the band for personal reasons. Jörg played all the remaining tour dates until 31 January in Guatemala City, and celebrated with a special Finnish "Farewell Jörg" tour from 18 to 26 November.

In March 2012, the band announced a drummer search on their Facebook page.
On 20 June 2012, the band announced that Rolf Pilve is their new drummer.

On 29 June 2012, live album and DVD Under Flaming Winter Skies - Live In Tampere has been released.
It was filmed in Tampere, Finland on 19 November 2011 and that is the last release with the drummer Jörg Michael.

Nemesis, Eternal, Enigma: Intermission 2 and Survive (2013–present)
Their new album, Nemesis, has been released on 22 February 2013. The first single, "Unbreakable", was released on 25 January 2013. They also released a DVD called Nemesis Days with some Nemesis World Tour recordings in this same year.

In August 2014 the band announced they would play a few shows dedicated to their 1997 hit album Visions. During these shows, the whole album was played. The premiere of these concept shows was 12 September 2014: their headliner performance at Progpower USA in Atlanta.

On 5 December 2014 Elements Pt. 1 and Elements Pt. 2 were reissued as a box set which included the high quality 3CD+DVD digi-pak, a cassette including previously unreleased demo songs which are only available on this format and are not made available anywhere else, an "Elements" tour T-shirt as well as a reproduction of the original tour program.

On 24 April 2015, Stratovarius announced that their sixteenth studio album, Eternal, would be released on 11 September 2015. On 23 June 2015, Stratovarius unveiled Eternal's cover, as well as the official track list of the album. On 30 July 2015, the band announced that the lead single from Eternal will be Shine in the Dark. An official lyric video featuring vocalist Timo Kotipelto was uploaded onto YouTube. In October 2015, Stratovarius embarked on a world tour to promote the new album. They began this with a European Tour of 16 countries including France, Germany, and the Netherlands. Gloryhammer and Divine Ascension were the support acts for the European leg of the tour.

On 20 May 2016, the band released their Best Of compilation, which included one previously unreleased track called "Until the End of Days".

On 13 January 2018, Kotipelto discussed recent anniversary shows and also commented that the band had hoped to record a new album during spring 2018. On 10 August 2018, Stratovarius released the new song "Oblivion" from the upcoming compilation album Enigma: Intermission 2, which came out 28 September 2018. It is the follow-up to 2001's Intermission. The band supported the new album with a European tour with Tarja Turunen on the A Nordic Symphony '18 tour.

By September 2021, Stratovarius had been tracking their new album at Kotipelto's studio. The new album Survive was released on 23 September 2022.

Musical style
Stratovarius is described as primarily a power metal band and one of the most influential groups of the genre, and also encompassed other genres, such as neoclassical metal, progressive metal and symphonic metal.

Band members

 Current members
 Timo Kotipelto – vocals (1994–present)
 Jens Johansson – keyboards (1995–present)
 Lauri Porra – bass, backing vocals (2005–present)
 Matias Kupiainen – guitars, backing vocals (2008–present)
 Rolf Pilve – drums (2012–present)

 Former members
 Timo Tolkki – guitars (1985–2008), lead vocals (1985–1994), backing vocals (1994–2008)
 Tuomo Lassila – drums (1985–1995)
 Mika Ervaskari – keyboards (1985–1987, died 2005)
 Jyrki Lentonen – bass (1985–1990)
 Antti Ikonen – keyboards (1988–1995)
 Jari Behm – bass (1989–1993)
 Jari Kainulainen – bass (1993–2005)
 Jörg Michael – drums (1995–2012)

 Black Water line-up (1984–1985)
 Tuomo Lassila – drums, lead vocals
 John Vihervä – bass
 Staffan Stråhlman – guitars
 Mika Ervaskari – keyboards

 Former session musicians
 Sami Kuoppamäki (studio) – drums (1993-1994)
 Anders Johansson (live) – drums (2004)
 Alex Landenburg (live) – drums (2010)

Timeline

Discography

Studio albums
 Fright Night (1989)
 Twilight Time (1992)
 Dreamspace (1994)
 Fourth Dimension (1995)
 Episode (1996)
 Visions (1997)
 Destiny (1998)
 Infinite (2000)
 Elements Pt. 1 (2003)
 Elements Pt. 2 (2003)
 Stratovarius (2005)
 Polaris (2009)
 Elysium (2011)
 Nemesis (2013)
 Eternal (2015)
   Survive (2022)

References

External links

 
 
 

 
1984 establishments in Finland
Articles which contain graphical timelines
Finnish power metal musical groups
Finnish progressive metal musical groups
Finnish symphonic metal musical groups
Musical groups established in 1984
Musical groups from Helsinki
Musical quintets
Nuclear Blast artists